Akuapem Anafo (Akuapem South) is an Akan autonomous paramountcy in Ghana. It was established by decision of the Larteh Accord in 1994. The Larteh Accord, replacing the older Abotakyi Accord, separated the traditional territories of the Akuapem State into three autonomous paramountcies:

Akuapem Anafo
Akuapem Guan 
Akuapem Okere

List of rulers of the Akuapem Anafo

References 

Ghana history-related lists
Government of Ghana
Ghana politics-related lists
Akan state of Akuapem Anafo